Interferon gamma receptor 1 (IFNGR1) also known as CD119 (Cluster of Differentiation 119), is a protein that in humans is encoded by the IFNGR1 gene.

Function 

The gene IFNGR1 encodes IFN-γR1, which is the ligand-binding chain (alpha) of the heterodimeric gamma interferon receptor, which is found on macrophages. IFNGR2, encodes IFN-γR2, the non-ligand-binding partner of the heterodimeric receptor.

Interactions 

Interferon gamma receptor 1 has been shown to interact with Interferon-gamma.

Mutations 
Mutations in the IFNGR1 gene can lead to extreme susceptibility to Mycobacterial infections. All known mutations and common variations in the IFNGR1 are present in the IFNGR1 mutation database.

See also 
 Cluster of differentiation
 Interferon-gamma receptor

References

Further reading

External links 
 

Clusters of differentiation